Because of their proximity and similar sporting cultures, Canada and United States are frequent rivals in a wide variety of international sports.

Overall rivalry and the Olympic Games 
For both countries, the Soviet Union was often the common rival in most international competitions before 1991.  However, since the fall of the Soviet Union, the two neighbouring countries have been more heated rivals, especially in winter sports where the talent pools of the two countries are more evenly matched.  Although the United States has more medals than Canada in gold, silver, bronze, and total medals won throughout the history of the Winter Games, the gap has narrowed considerably over time. The rivalry is much more keenly felt by, and is often a source of angst for, Canadians, as a result of Canadian national teams being frequently humiliated by their American counterparts in most sports. 

In summer sports, the Canada-USA rivalry is more muted as the United States dominates. The United States' closest rival at the Summer Olympics is now China. All time, the United States is the number one ranked country in gold, silver, bronze, and total medals won.

In the run-up to the 1998 Winter Olympics, Los Angeles Times columnist Mike Penner named Canada the United States' most important rival, especially in hockey. and USA Today ran the headline "Cold War now means Canada", with Canadian columnist Terry Jones reporting that the Canadian Olympic team approved of the comments and shared the news clippings around the athlete's village in Nagano.

In the Winter Olympics, both the United States and Canada have won the medal table once, while the US is ranked second in the all time Winter Olympic table, with Canada ranked fifth. In the Summer Olympics, the United States has won the medal count 18 times, compared to zero for Canada. The United States is ranked number 1 in the all time Summer Olympic medal table, while Canada is ranked number 20. 

Based on results in Olympics, World Championships, and other major competitions for respective sports, the United States is more successful than Canada in American football, baseball, basketball, soccer, tennis, golf, swimming, athletics, boxing, lacrosse, shooting, diving, wrestling, rowing, gymnastics, sailing, cycling, weightlifting, water polo, archery, equestrian, volleyball, beach volleyball, fencing, triathlon, judo, taekwondo, figure skating, snowboarding, speed skating, alpine skiing, and bobsleigh among others, while Canada is better all time in ice hockey, curling and rugby. The United States is the most successful nation in the world in sports.

Baseball 
It was considered a major upset when Canada defeated the United States in the 2006 World Baseball Classic, which some commentators called a "Miracle on Dirt", reference to the Miracle on Ice when the US national hockey team beat the USSR in 1980. 

The United States beat Canada in the 2009 World Baseball Classic in Toronto. The United States also beat Canada in the 2013 World Baseball Classic. The United States beat Canada again in the 2017 World Baseball Classic, by a score of 8-0. The United States once again beat Canada in the 2023 World Baseball Classic, this time by a score of 12-1, in a game that was ended after 7 innings due to the 10 run mercy rule. Although there are only two Canadians in the U.S. Hall of Fame (Ferguson Jenkins and Larry Walker), three different Canadian players have been named MVP of either the National or American League since 1997 (Larry Walker, NL, 1997; Justin Morneau, AL, 2006; Joey Votto, NL, 2010). The United States is ranked second in the WBSC World Rankings while Canada placed 8th.

Cricket 
While cricket is not among the most popular sports in either country, they have the distinction of having played against each other in the first ever international match of any sport in 1844.

Ice hockey
For both genders and at all ages groups, Canada - US games are among the most important in international hockey.  Since the decline of the Soviet Union in 1991, this rivalry has certainly been one of the most passionate of all.

Men's

Ice hockey is by far the most competitive sport between the two countries. The two teams have been close rivals since the early days of international hockey, facing each other for the gold medal at the first Olympic hockey tournament in 1920. The US was not able to defeat Canada until the 1960 Winter Olympics, and achieved their most recent victory at the 1980 Olympics. However, during the 1991 Canada Cup, American defense man Gary Suter cross-checked and injured Canadian superstar Wayne Gretzky, creating a feeling of animosity among Canadian fans. In 1996, the United States won a victory during a best-on-best men's tournament by defeating Canada at the 1996 World Cup of Hockey on Canadian soil in Montreal. Canada took revenge by beating the US for the Gold again at the 2002 Olympics on American soil in Salt Lake City. During their next Olympic match, Canada defeated the US in a gold medal game at the 2010 Olympics on Canadian soil in Vancouver, after the United States shocked Canada in the group stage of the tournament.  The two teams faced off against each other in the 2014 Olympics in Sochi's semi-final for the right to go to the gold medal game, which Canada once again won. Most recently, the US and Canada faced off against each other in the 2022 Olympics in the group stage, which the US won 4-2. Neither the US nor Canada used NHL players in the 2022 tournament, so the result did not have the same importance as the 2010 and 2014 matches between the two nations did.

Junior

The two countries are perennial rivals at the World Junior Championships for players under 20 years of age. Overall, Canada holds a total of 18 gold medals, while the United States holds five gold medals. Since 2010 both the U.S. and Canada have won 4 World Junior Championships.

Women's

Canada and the U.S. have faced each other in the championship game of nearly every Olympics and World Championships since the beginning of international play. Few of Canada's and the U.S.'s losses have been to teams outside their rivalry. After an American victory during the 1998 Nagano Olympics, the Canadian Olympic team won the next four gold medals; the USA won the most recent gold medal after a penalty shootout in the 2018 final. United States has won 4 championships in a row. The United States lost to team Canada 2-1 while outshooting the Canadians 45-23 in a group stage matchup in the 2018 Olympic games. During the 2002 USA vs Canada ice hockey match for women's gold, Canada won. However, at the World Championships, the rivalry has recently been dominated by the USA who have won 7 of the last 9 World Championships.

Lacrosse

Field

Men's
No team other than Canada or the US has ever won the World Lacrosse Championship.  The US has ten championships, and Canada has three.

Rugby Union

Men's
Both countries are middle-of-pack internationally in rugby union, and therefore closely matched.  Canada's first win in an international "test match" was against the USA in 1977. The teams formerly faced each other in the regional PARA Pan American Championship and Churchill Cup, and still do in the Pan American Games and Americas Rugby Championship.

Wheelchair

Men's 
The rivalry between the two teams was the subject of an Oscar-nominated 2005 documentary film Murderball.

Soccer

Men's
The two clubs frequently face each other in the Gold Cup, however the United States has historically been the stronger side.  The overall record as of January 30, 2022 is 17 wins for the US, 10 wins for Canada, and 11 draws in favor of the United States, and American soccer fans generally look to Mexico as the main rival, while Canada is a secondary rival. The United States has qualified for 11 World Cups and has made it to the semifinals in 1930, the quarterfinals in 2002, and has made it to the round of 16 in 1934, 1994, 2010, 2014 and 2022, while on the only two occasions that Canada qualified for the World Cup, in 1986 and 2022, they didn't make it past the group stage in either, and have only scored 1 goals in their tournament history. Canada is not usually seen as a competitive rival as they had not beaten the United States since a friendly in 1985 until October 15, 2019 when Canada defeated the United States 2-0 at BMO Field in Toronto. The following month, on November 15, the United States beat Canada 4–1 in Orlando. Since then, matches between the two have been very competitive. The US defeated Canada 1–0 in a 2021 Gold Cup matchup in Kansas City. In 2022 World Cup qualifying, Canada earned a 1–1 draw in Nashville and defeated the US 2–0 in Hamilton.

The US under-23 team defeated Canada to take the bronze medal at the 1999 Pan-Am Games on Canadian soil in Winnipeg. On the other hand, Canada's under-20 team defeated the US to win their group of the 2003 CONCACAF U-20 Tournament in Charleston, South Carolina.

A Canadian club, Galt F.C., beat an American club, Christian Brothers College, for the gold at the 1904 Summer Olympics in St. Louis.

Updated to matches played on January 30, 2022

Women's
The two teams are more closely matched than in the men's game, providing for more close finishes.  Notably the two nations faced each other in the final of the 2002 FIFA U-19 Women's World Championship on Canadian soil in Edmonton, with the United States winning.  The two nations' senior sides met in the third place match of the 2003 FIFA Women's World Cup on American soil in Carson, California.  Also, Canada's senior team beat the US under-20 team in the final of the 2008 Cyprus Cup.  At the 2012 CONCACAF Women's Olympic Qualifying Tournament in Vancouver, the US defeated Canada 4-0 in the final.

By 2012, the US won every match since 2001, 26 in a row.  There was a memorable match between the two teams during 2012 London Olympics semi-finals, which a concacaf.com columnist had described as the most important of their 26-year-long rivalry on the international scene.  The Canadians led the match at three different points, but were ultimately defeated in overtime, allowing the Americans to advance to the Gold Medal Match. The United States most recently won the Women's World Cup on Canadian soil and then again in 2019 in France, which increased their record to 4 World Cup wins and 4 Olympic gold medals. Canada won the Olympic Gold Medal at the 2020 Summer Olympics defeating the United States 1-0 in the semifinal match. The United States leads the overall series with 53 wins for the United States, 4 wins for Canada, and 7 draws.

References

Canada–United States relations
Regional rivalries
Sports rivalries in Canada
Sports rivalries in the United States
International sports rivalries